The Enfield Shaker Museum is an outdoor history museum and historic district in Enfield, New Hampshire, in the United States. It is dedicated to preserving and sharing the history of the Shakers, a Protestant religious denomination, who lived on the site from 1793 to 1923. The museum features exhibitions, artifacts, eight Shaker buildings and restored Shaker gardens. It is located in a valley between Mount Assurance and Mascoma Lake in Enfield.

One of the buildings, the Great Stone Dwelling, was the largest residential building north of Boston and is the largest Shaker building. When the Shaker community closed, most of the land that made up the Enfield Shaker Village was sold to the Missionaries of La Salette. The state owns  and 13 buildings, which is now the Enfield Shaker Museum.

Shakers

Village history 

A meetinghouse was built May 1793 and a residential building was constructed in 1794. Subsequent buildings were made of granite with advanced stone masonry techniques, which was revolutionary for that time period. There were 132 members of the village by 1803, and by 1840 there were nearly 300 people.

Within the village was the largest Shaker dwelling and the largest residential dwelling north of Boston, the Great Stone Building. Built from 1837 to 1841 for the Church Family, it had four full stories and a total of six stories. Men and women lived in the building, but entered doors specific for their gender to separate quarters. It was designed by Ammi Burnham Young, who created the designs for the second state capitol in Vermont and was the first supervising architect for the United States Treasury. The granite stonework on the exterior and the slate roof were constructed by stonemasons from Boston. The Shaker brothers constructed the rest of the building themselves.

In 1849, the Shakers built the half-mile long Shaker Bridge that crossed a narrow portion of Lake Mascoma to the railroad line. In 1870, the elaborate Victorian and Shaker architectural Ministry shop was built to house the community's religious leaders. To support itself, the community made brooms, buckets, spinning wheels, tubs, dry measures and shirts. It also made and sold applesauce, maple syrup, herbs, medicines and seeds.

Like other Shaker communities, the Enfield Shaker village declined throughout the second half of the 19th century. In 1923, they closed the Enfield Shaker village and moved to the Canterbury community in central New Hampshire.

Much of the village property was sold in 1927 to the La Salettes. The site is listed on the U.S. National Register of Historic Places as the Enfield Shaker Historic District.

Museum 
Since 1986, the Enfield Shaker Museum has worked to preserve the Shaker heritage of the site without neglecting the 20th century history of the village. The Great Stone Dwelling houses the gift shop and the primary exhibition space. The museum is open 7 days a week, offering tours of the site, and offers overnight stays in the original Shaker bedrooms of the Great Stone Dwelling.

There are 13 remaining Shaker village buildings and gardens on 28 acres, which can be seen during a self-guided walking tour. The village museum is owned by the state of New Hampshire.

Missionaries of La Salette 
In 1927, the site was sold to the Missionaries of La Salette, who converted the site into a seminary for the Catholic priesthood, school and conference site. The La Salettes built in 1930 the Mary Keane Chapel, a neo-classical revival chapel, which is now part of the museum and open to visitors. The Missionaries of La Salette closed the seminary in 1974, and the center is now known as the Shrine of Our Lady of La Salette, which is a center of "reconciliation".

See also
Enfield Village Historic District
National Register of Historic Places listings in Grafton County, New Hampshire
New Hampshire Historical Marker No. 202: The Enfield Shakers
Shaker Seed Company
Thomas Corbett (Shaker doctor)

References

External links 

 Museum website
 Overnight stays at the Great Stone Dwelling
 LaSalette, Center for Reconciliation

Shaker communities or museums
Herb gardens
Residential buildings completed in 1841
Open-air museums in New Hampshire
Museums in Grafton County, New Hampshire
History museums in New Hampshire
Museums established in 1986
1986 establishments in New Hampshire
Historic districts on the National Register of Historic Places in New Hampshire
National Register of Historic Places in Grafton County, New Hampshire
Enfield, New Hampshire